Yvonne Sherwell (May 27, 1927 – April 6, 2020) was an American actress, dancer, and author.

Sherwell was born in Waterbury, Connecticut. She was the daughter of Helen Louise Sherwell, a playwright and reporter for the Westerly Sun, and Guillermo Sherwell, a banking executive.

Sherwell had roles in low-cost movies, acted in plays, sang cabaret, was a Spanish dancer, and author. In the 1980s she worked part-time as a coat checker at the Algonquin Hotel. She appeared mostly in off-off Broadway shows, including “Big Charlotte,” the John Wallowitch musical.

She was also a member of the leadership of the Village Independent Democrats political club.

She wrote Paranoid Pip, a memoir, and Paranoid Pussy Cats, a collection of short stories.  In 2018 she wrote Zig Zag, an autobiography.

In 1950 she married Paul Eugene Rose, who worked for Lord & Taylor. The couple had one son. In 1958 she married Julio Prol, a guitarist and teacher. They had two children together. She later married Christos Demakopoulos.

In 2012 she was brutally mugged in her apartment building.

She died of the coronavirus in April 2020.

References 

American stage actresses
American female dancers
American dancers
American women writers
American writers
1927 births
2020 deaths
21st-century American women